John Javier Restrepo (born August 22, 1977) is a former football midfielder who played for the Colombia national football team between 2001 and 2010, winning the Copa América in 2001. He last played for Rionegro Águilas before retirement.

He returned to play for his old club Deportivo Independiente Medellín, after leaving Tigres in Mexico. His past clubs include Atlético Bucaramanga in Colombia and Cruz Azul in Mexico.

Honours
Independiente Medellín
Categoría Primera A: 2002-II, 2009-II

Colombia national football team
Copa América: 2001

External links
 

1977 births
Living people
Footballers from Medellín
Colombian footballers
Colombia international footballers
2001 Copa América players
2003 CONCACAF Gold Cup players
Copa América-winning players
Atlético Bucaramanga footballers
Independiente Medellín footballers
Cruz Azul footballers
Tigres UANL footballers
Águilas Doradas Rionegro players
Club Celaya footballers
Categoría Primera A players
Liga MX players
Colombian expatriate footballers
Expatriate footballers in Mexico
Colombian expatriate sportspeople in Mexico
Association football midfielders